Nándor Balázs (July 7, 1926August 16, 2003) was a Hungarian-American physicist, external member of the Hungarian Academy of Sciences (from 1995).

Early life and education
Balázs attended to the Rácz private primary school and was a classmate of Janos Kemeny.
Nándor Balázs received a master's degree at the University of Budapest (1948). Balázs left communist Hungary in 1949. He received a PhD at the University of Amsterdam (1951).

Scientific career 
After receiving his PhD, Balázs spent two years (1951 and 1952) as assistant to Schroedinger at the Dublin Institute for Advanced Studies, one year (autumn 1952 through summer 1953) as assistant to Albert Einstein at the Institute for Advanced Study in Princeton, and was Associate Professor of Physics at the University of Alabama during the years 1953–56.  From 1956 to 1959, he was Research Associate at the Enrico Fermi Institute at the University of Chicago, and then became a Research Staff Member at the Plasma Physics Laboratory at Princeton University from 1959 to 1961. In 1961 he went to the Stony Brook University.
During his life, Balázs had close friendships and working collaborations
with Schroedinger, Paul Dirac (Dirac's wife, Margit Wigner, was Hungarian), Subrahmanyan Chandrasekhar, Eugene Wigner, and other major figures in 20th-century physics.

Balázs maintained contacts in his native Hungary and occasionally brought Hungarian
physicists to the US. In his collaborations with people in Budapest (notably Béla Lukács and József Zimányi), he dealt with relativistic heavy-ion collisions and thus provided a connection between Stony Brook (a home of RHIC theory) and Hungary.

Papers:
Effect of a gravitational field, due to a rotating body, on the plane of polarization of an electromagnetic wave. Phys. Rev. 110, 236–239 (1958)

EINSTEIN: Theory of Relativity. Gillispie (ed.) Dictionary of Scientific Biography, vol. IV, 319-332 (1971)

References

1926 births
2003 deaths
20th-century Hungarian inventors
Hungarian emigrants to the United States
Members of the Hungarian Academy of Sciences
Hungarian nuclear physicists
American nuclear physicists
People from Pest, Hungary
University of Chicago faculty